The 2020 Italian regional elections took place in nine regions of Italy during 2020. Elections took place on 26 January 2020 in Emilia-Romagna and Calabria, and on 20 and 21 September in Aosta Valley, Campania, Liguria, Marche, Apulia, Tuscany, and Veneto. The September elections took place concurrently with the 2020 Italian constitutional referendum.

Overall results

Regional councils

Regional presidents

Results by region

Calabria

Emilia-Romagna

Aosta Valley

Apulia

Campania

Liguria

Marche

Tuscany

Veneto

References

2020
2020 elections in Italy